John J. Barton (June 23, 1906 – May 4, 2004) was an American politician who served one term as mayor of Indianapolis. During his time in office, plans were made for the construction of the Indiana Convention Center. He was defeated for re-election by Indianapolis Board of School Commissioners member and future United States Senator Richard Lugar in 1967.

Barton was an alumnus of Purdue University (class of 1930) and served in the military in World War II. He died on May 4, 2004, aged 97.

Election results

References

External links

1906 births
2004 deaths
Purdue University alumni
Indiana Democrats
Mayors of Indianapolis
Military personnel from Indiana
20th-century American politicians